Lovers Lane is the debut album by M.C. Brains, released on March 17, 1992 through Motown.

The album is perhaps best known for its lead single, "Oochie Coochie", which became the only top-40 hit in M.C. Brains short career, peaking at number 22 on the Billboard Hot 100. The album fared less well, only reaching number 47 on the Billboard 200. Brains' labelmates Boyz II Men were featured on the album's second single "Brainstorming", as well as the song entitled "Boyz II Men (The Sequel)". The latter song's chorus was interpolated in the group's own sophomore album, II (1994).

Track listing

Chart history

Personnel 

Rico Anderson - Producer, Programming, Vocals (Background)
Marlene Battles - Vocals (Background)
Michael Bivins - Vocals (Background)
Boyz II Men - Vocals (Background)
James "Thunderbird" Davis - Vocals (Background)
Finesse Flavor - Engineer, Producer, Programming, Vocals (Background)
Michael Gibson - Assistant Engineer
Johnny Gill - Vocals (Background)
Jim Hinger - Engineer
Fred Jenkins - Keyboards, Producer, Programming
Jay Lean - Engineer
M.C. Brains - Vocals, Vocals (Background)
 
Mike Melnick - Engineer
Nathan Morris - Keyboards, Producer, Programming
Radical Rob Onekea - Producer
Morris Rentie - Assistant Engineer, Bass
Todd Russaw - Vocals (Background)
Shawn Stockman - Drums, Percussion, Producer
Ralph Sutton - Engineer
Tam Rock - Rap, Vocals (Background)
Jerry Vines - Vocals (Background)
Kevin Wales - Vocals (Background)
Danny Clay Williams - Engineer
Val Young - Vocals (Background)

References

1992 debut albums
M.C. Brains albums
Motown albums